What Were They Thinking? is a Canadian documentary television series, which debuted in 2005 on The Comedy Network. Hosted by Sean Cullen, the series profiled the various quirky roadside attractions that towns and cities have erected in their quest to attract notice by building the "world's biggest" example of some random, often ridiculous, thing.

Cullen won a Gemini Award for best host in a lifestyle, practical information or performing arts program at the 21st Gemini Awards in 2006.

References

External links
 Official website (archived)

English-language television shows
2005 Canadian television series debuts
2005 Canadian television series endings
2000s Canadian documentary television series
2000s Canadian comedy television series
CTV Comedy Channel original programming